Naseem "Nas" Bashir (born 12 September 1969) is an English former footballer.

Coaching career

Bashir was Assistant Academy Manager at Reading between 2001 and 2009. Whilst at the club, he gained his UEFA Pro Licence and worked with Stuart Pearce coaching the England U21 side. He was also responsible for running courses at Charters School and the John Madejski Academy.

After founding the FAB academy based at Bisham Abbey, Bashir moved to Beaconsfield SYCOB in the summer of 2014 as Director of Football/General Manager, alongside Andy Hurley and Lee Togwell who assumed the manager and player/coach roles respectively.

Bashir stepped in as manager for the final weeks of the season following the departure of Gary Meakin in March 2015 on a caretaker basis. After stepping aside as caretaker manager, Bashir assumed his previous role as Director of Football.

Managerial statistics

References

External links

1969 births
Living people
People from Amersham
English footballers
Association football midfielders
Reading F.C. players
Slough Town F.C. players
Aylesbury United F.C. players
English Football League players
English football managers
Hayes & Yeading United F.C. managers
Beaconsfield Town F.C. managers
National League (English football) managers